The 2003 Altai earthquake, or 2003 Chuya earthquake, occurred on September 27 at  with a moment magnitude of 7.3 and a maximum Mercalli intensity of X (Extreme). The epicenter of this oblique-slip shock was in Altai Republic, Russia near the borders of Mongolia, China, and Kazakhstan. Three deaths and five injuries were reported and the total damage was listed as $10.6–33 million.

Earthquake
This earthquake had components of right-lateral strike-slip and reverse movement in a segmented fault zone which had not been previously recognized.

Damage
Between 99 and 300 houses destroyed, along with 1,942 other buildings affected. It was the strongest earthquake in this region since an estimated magnitude 7.7 earthquake on December 20, 1761.

Ground effects
Landslides affected the Kosh-Agachsky and Ust’-Ulagan Districts.

See also
List of earthquakes in 2003
List of earthquakes in Russia

References

External links

2003 earthquakes
Altai Earthquake, 2003
Earthquakes in Russia
Natural disasters in Siberia
September 2003 events in Russia
+Rus